Faisalabad Division is an administrative division of Punjab, Pakistan. The reforms of 2000 abolished the third tier of government but was restored again in 2008.

Districts
It consists of the following districts:

Demographics 
According to 2017 census, Faisalabad division had a population of 14,177,081, which includes 7,233,831 males and 6,949,921 females. 
Faisalabad division constitutes 13,769,252 Muslims, 338,590 Christians, 74,749 Ahmadi followed by 597 scheduled castes, 381 Hindus and 1,662 others.

See also 
 Divisions of Pakistan
 Divisions of Punjab, Pakistan

References

Divisions of Punjab, Pakistan
Faisalabad District